10244 Thüringer Wald, provisional designation , is a Vestian asteroid from the inner regions of the asteroid belt, approximately  in diameter. It was discovered on 26 September 1960, by Ingrid and Cornelis van Houten at Leiden, and Tom Gehrels at Palomar Observatory in California, United States. The asteroid was named after the Thuringian Forest, a German mountain range.

Orbit and classification 

Thüringer Wald is a member of the Vesta family. Vestian asteroids have a composition akin to cumulate eucrites (HED meteorites) and are thought to have originated deep within 4 Vesta's crust, possibly from the Rheasilvia crater, a large impact crater on its southern hemisphere near the South pole, formed as a result of a subcatastrophic collision. Vesta is the main belt's second-largest and second-most-massive body after .

Thüringer Wald orbits the Sun in the inner main-belt at a distance of 2.2–2.6 AU once every 3 years and 9 months (1,361 days; semi-major axis of 2.4 AU). Its orbit has an eccentricity of 0.10 and an inclination of 7° with respect to the ecliptic. Its observation arc begins with its official discovery observation at Palomar in September 1960.

Physical characteristics 

The asteroid's spectral type is unknown. Vestian asteroids typically have a V- or S-type, with albedos higher than measured by the WISE telescope (see below). It has an absolute magnitude of 14.6. As of 2018, no rotational lightcurve of Thüringer Wald has been obtained from photometric observations. The body's rotation period, pole and shape remain unknown.

Diameter and albedo 

According to the survey carried out by the NEOWISE mission of NASA's WISE telescope, Thüringer Wald measures 3.346 kilometers in diameter and its surface has an albedo of 0.190.

Palomar–Leiden survey 

The survey designation "P-L" stands for Palomar–Leiden, named after Palomar Observatory and Leiden Observatory, which collaborated on the fruitful Palomar–Leiden survey in the 1960s. Gehrels used Palomar's Samuel Oschin telescope (also known as the 48-inch Schmidt Telescope), and shipped the photographic plates to Ingrid and Cornelis van Houten at Leiden Observatory where astrometry was carried out. The trio are credited with the discovery of several thousand asteroid discoveries.

Naming 

This minor planet was named after the Thuringian Forest, a mountain range in central Germany. The official naming citation was published by the Minor Planet Center on 1 May 2003.

References

External links 
 Asteroid Lightcurve Database (LCDB), query form (info )
 Dictionary of Minor Planet Names, Google books
 Discovery Circumstances: Numbered Minor Planets (10001)-(15000) – Minor Planet Center
 
 

010244
Discoveries by Cornelis Johannes van Houten
Discoveries by Ingrid van Houten-Groeneveld
Discoveries by Tom Gehrels
4668
Named minor planets
19600926